"Fake" is a song written and recorded by British soft rock group Simply Red. It was released in July 2003 as the second single from the album, Home. It was the next single after their international smash hit "Sunrise". It reached number-one on the U.S. Billboard Hot Dance Club Play for the week of 14 February 2004.

Track listings

Music video
The music video was filmed at a nightclub in Watford, England and was directed by Andy Morahan. It features Mick Hucknall walking around in the nightclub and talking to people who look like famous artists and celebrities. Among them are doubles of Eminem, Ozzy Osbourne, Naomi Campbell, Kylie Minogue, Diana Ross, Robert De Niro, Madonna, Britney Spears, Pamela Anderson, Cameron Diaz, Pierce Brosnan, Sean Connery, Halle Berry, Michael Jackson, Joan Collins, Cher, David Beckham and Victoria Beckham. Hucknall also meets his own double. It also features Hucknall in a library when the line "I read a book and it's your face" is said.

Chart performance

Weekly charts

Year-end charts

See also
 List of number-one dance singles of 2004 (U.S.)

References

2003 songs
2003 singles
Music videos directed by Andy Morahan
Simply Red songs
Song recordings produced by Mick Hucknall
Songs written by Mick Hucknall
Song recordings produced by Stewart Levine
Cultural depictions of Madonna